A crime information center is a data warehouse and search engine operated by a staff of detectives that assists in providing relevant and timely information to officers conducting an investigation. The computer network stores facts about convicted persons, suspects, encounters, nicknames and items of seemingly trivial value whose correlation could assist in an investigation. The computer network's control room can display real-time satellite and surveillance camera images and hosts a wireless link to police vehicles equipped to generate sketches at crime scenes and transmit them for comparison to stored data.

List of CICs in the United States
 NCIC, run by the FBI
 Real Time Crime Center, run by the NYPD
 GCIC, run by the Georgia Bureau of Investigation

See also
Interstate Identification Index

References

Law enforcement databases in the United States
Criminal justice
Criminal law
Criminal records